Kailash Pati of the Indian National Congress (Indira) party won the 1980 Indian general election from Mohanlalganj.

References

India MPs 1980–1984
20th-century Indian women politicians
20th-century Indian politicians
People from Lucknow district
Lok Sabha members from Uttar Pradesh
Indian National Congress politicians from Uttar Pradesh